Ronald Howard Paulson (born May 27, 1930 in Bottineau, North Dakota) is an American professor of English, a specialist in English 18th-century art and culture, and the world's leading expert on English artist William Hogarth.

Education 

Paulson earned a Bachelor of Arts degree from Yale University in 1952, where he was an editorial associate of campus humor magazine The Yale Record. He earned his doctorate degree from Yale in 1958.

Academic career 
Paulson has taught and held various administrative positions at several universities in the United States, including the University of Illinois from 1959 to 1963 and Rice University from 1963 to 1967. He was the Chairman of the Johns Hopkins University English Department from 1967 to 1975. From 1975 to 1984 he was a professor at Yale University and served as the Director of Graduate Studies in the English Department from 1976 to 1983 and the Director of the British Studies Program from 1976 to 1984.

Paulson returned to Johns Hopkins University in 1984, serving as the Department Chairman from 1985 to 1991.

He has been a member of the editorial board of the academic journal ELH: English Literary History and was senior editor from 1985 to 2004; he served on the editorial boards of the journals Studies in English Literature; PMLA; Eighteenth-Century Studies; and the Johns Hopkins University Press.

On Paulson’s 3 vol. Hogarth,: “it must be the most detailed and the most deeply pondered monograph on a Btitish artist ever written” (Michael Kitson, Painting in Britain, 1530-1790).

Of Hogarth, “in our own time, the American scholar Ronald Paulson has devoted to him the best three-volume biography written about any eighteenth-century Englishman” (Paul Johnson, Humorists).

Honors and recognitions 
Paulson was the Andrew W. Mellon Professor of the Humanities at Johns Hopkins University from 1973 to 1975 and has been the Mayer Professor of Humanities since 1985. He was a member of the Academic and Advisory Committees and Governing Board of the Yale Center for British Art and the Paul Mellon Centre for British Art in London from 1975 to 1984. He has also been a Guggenheim Fellow (1965–66, 1986–87), an NEH Senior Fellow (1977–78), and a fellow of the Rockefeller Foundation (1978, 1987).

In 1988, Paulson traveled with several humorists from the United States to the Soviet Union as part of a cultural exchange.

Books 
 Theme and Structure in Swift's 'Tale of a Tub (1960)
 Hogarth's Graphic Works (1965)
 The Fictions of Satire (1967)
 Satire and the Novel in Eighteenth-Century England (1967)
 Hogarth: His Life, Art, and Times (1971)
 Rowlandson: A New Interpretation (1972)
 Emblem and Expression: Meaning in English Art of the Eighteenth Century (1975)
 The Art of Hogarth (1975)
 Popular and Polite Art in the Age of Hogarth and Fielding (1979)
 Literary Landscape: Turner and Constable (1982)
 Representations of Revolution (1789–1820) (1983)
 Book and Painting: Shakespeare, Milton, and the Bible (1983)
 Breaking and Remaking: Aesthetic Practice in England, 1700–1820 (1989)
 Hogarth's Graphic Works (rewritten and reset) (1989)
 Figure & Abstraction in Contemporary Painting (1990)
 Hogarth, Vols. 1–3 (1991–93)
 The Beautiful, Novel, and Strange: Aesthetics and Heterodoxy (1997)
 The Analysis of Beauty (editor) (1997)
 Don Quixote in England: The Aesthetics of Laughter (1998)
 The Life of Henry Fielding (2000)
 Hogarth's Harlot: Sacred Parody in Enlightenment England (2003)
 Sin and Evil: Moral Values in Literature (2006)
 The Art of Riot in England and America (2010)

References 

1930 births
Living people
People from Bottineau County, North Dakota
American academics of English literature
Yale University alumni
University of Illinois Urbana-Champaign faculty
Rice University faculty
Johns Hopkins University faculty
Yale University faculty